The Ruf RTurbo is a sports car built by Ruf Automobile of Germany and introduced in 2001. It is based on the 996 generation Porsche 911. The RTurbo could be had as either a complete Ruf car with unique VIN or a conversion for an existing 996 retaining the original Porsche VIN.

Specifications 
The RTurbo is based on the 996 generation Porsche 911 and could be ordered as a coupe or cabriolet, with either a widebody Turbo bodyshell or an optional narrow body Carrera bodyshell and with a choice between all-wheel-drive and optional rear-wheel-drive.

Exterior upgrades include a choice of Ruf modular 18 inch or aluminum alloy 19 inch wheels, redesigned front and rear bumpers and quad exhaust tips. On the interior, the RTurbo has lightweight racing seats, revised gauges and a special sports steering wheel, with optional extras including an integrated roll cage, a traditional Ruf green leather interior or a leather interior in a colour chosen by the customer.

The base RTurbo, which is the widebody model with 520 hp, a 6-speed manual transmission, a 5-speed automatic transmission and all-wheel-drive, was priced at 189,300 euros, with the narrow body version costing an additional 20,600 euros.

Performance 
The RTurbo is available in 520, 550 and 590 hp variants. All variants are powered by a tuned version of the 3.6 litre flat-6 engine from the 996 911 Turbo. The engine is tuned by Ruf with modified KKK turbochargers, a remapped engine computer, Porsche GT3 engine mounts, upgraded valve train, a modified VarioCam system and an exhaust system with a bypass valve. For the optional 590 hp package, the engine also receives titanium connecting rods, upgraded camshafts and a heat exchanger to handle the power. The drivetrain consists of a Porsche GT2 transaxle, a stronger upgraded clutch, a limited slip differential and optional 4-wheel drive. The suspension is upgraded with new shocks, springs, stabiliser bars, and RUF-Brembo brake discs and calipers.

The higher specification model is rated at  

References

External links 

 Ruf Auto Centre

Ruf vehicles
Cars powered by boxer engines
Sports cars
Rear-engined vehicles
Cars introduced in 2001